The Benjamin Franklin Award is an annual award for Open Access in the Life Sciences presented by Bioinformatics.org to an individual who has, in his or her practice, promoted free and open access to the materials and methods used in the life sciences.

Laureates
Source: bioinformatics.org

2002 - Michael B. Eisen
2003 - Jim Kent
2004 - Lincoln D. Stein
2005 - Ewan Birney
2006 - Michael Ashburner
2007 - Sean Eddy
2008 - Robert Gentleman
2009 - Philip E. Bourne
2010 - Alex Bateman
2011 - Jonathan Eisen
2012 - Heng Li
2013 - Steven Salzberg
2014 - Helen M. Berman
2015 - Owen White
2016 - Benjamin Langmead
2017 - Rafael Irizarry
2018 - Desmond G. Higgins
2019 - Eugene Koonin
2020 - Xiaole Shirley Liu

See also
 Awards in Bioinformatics and Computational Biology
 List of biology awards
 Prizes named after people

Sources

American science and technology awards
Bioinformatics
Biology awards
Awards established in 2002
2002 establishments in the United States
Benjamin Franklin